Timothy D. DeGiusti (born March 3, 1962) is the Chief United States district judge of the United States District Court for the Western District of Oklahoma.

Education and career
Timothy DeGiusti was born in Oklahoma City, Oklahoma and attended Douglas High School. DeGiusti served as an officer in the Army National Guard/U.S. Army Reserve from 1981 to 2003, including as a military lawyer in the Judge Advocate General's Corps. He received a Bachelor of Arts degree from the University of Oklahoma in 1985 and a Juris Doctor from the University of Oklahoma College of Law in 1988. In 2018 he received a Master of Laws degree from Duke University Law School. He was in private practice in Oklahoma City from 1988 to 1990 and again from 1993 to 2007. He was a Trial counsel, U.S. Army, JAG Corps from 1990 to 1993. He was an Adjunct professor of law at the University of Oklahoma College of Law from 1998 to 2003.

Federal judicial service

On February 15, 2007, DeGiusti was nominated by President George W. Bush to a seat on the United States District Court for the Western District of Oklahoma vacated by Timothy D. Leonard. DeGiusti was confirmed by the United States Senate on August 3, 2007, and received his commission on August 9, 2007. He became Chief Judge on July 1, 2019.

References

Sources

1962 births
Living people
Judges of the United States District Court for the Western District of Oklahoma
United States district court judges appointed by George W. Bush
21st-century American judges
United States Army officers
University of Oklahoma alumni
University of Oklahoma College of Law alumni
Lawyers from Oklahoma City
Military personnel from Oklahoma
American people of Italian descent
United States Army reservists
United States Army Judge Advocate General's Corps